Micromacromia miraculosa is a species of dragonfly in the family Libellulidae. It is endemic to Tanzania.  Its natural habitats are subtropical or tropical moist lowland forests and rivers. It is threatened by habitat loss.

References

Libellulidae
Endemic fauna of Tanzania
Insects of Tanzania
Taxonomy articles created by Polbot
Insects described in 1906